Claude Earl "Chuck" Rayner (August 11, 1920 – October 6, 2002), nicknamed "Bonnie Prince Charlie", was a Canadian professional hockey goaltender who played nine seasons in the National Hockey League for the New York Americans and New York Rangers. He is a member of the Hockey Hall of Fame.

Early life
Rayner was born August 11, 1920, in Sutherland, Saskatchewan.

Playing career
Playing his junior career for the Kenora Thistles of the Manitoba junior league, Rayner showed his skill early, backstopping the team to the Abbott Cup to advance to the Memorial Cup championship in 1940.  The next season, he turned professional for the Americans, spending most of the year with the Amerks' minor league affiliate, the Springfield Indians of the AHL.  With the Indians, Rayner led the league in shutouts and goals against average and was named to the Second All-Star Team.

The following season Rayner was the leading goalie for the Americans' final season before the team folded.  World War II interrupted Rayner's career, however, and he spent the next three years in the Royal Canadian Navy, where he played two seasons for naval teams based out of Victoria.

After the war, he signed as a free agent in 1945 with the Rangers.  Rayner was the starting goaltender for New York six of the next seven seasons, earning accolades for his play even though the Rangers' teams of the era were weak, and Rayner never had a winning record.  He was noted as a puckhandling goalie, attempting several times throughout his career to score a goal.

Even though he played on poor teams throughout his career and never won a Stanley Cup, "Bonnie Prince Charlie" was one of the best goalies of his era.  The three years between 1948 and 1951 were his best, and he won the Hart Trophy as the NHL's most valuable player in 1950, after leading the Rangers to overtime in the seventh game of the Stanley Cup finals.

Post-NHL career
In 1953, Rayner suffered a knee injury and lost his job as Rangers' starter to Gump Worsley.  He played one more season in the minors for the Saskatoon Quakers of the Western Hockey League and a couple of brief stints in the senior leagues the two seasons thereafter before hanging up his skates for good.

He was inducted into the Hockey Hall of Fame in 1973, the second goaltender in history to be inducted with a losing record.

Although his hometown of Sutherland became annexed into Saskatoon, Rayner Avenue in the city's Sutherland neighbourhood is named in his honor.

Rayner died on October 6, 2002, of a heart attack.

Awards and achievements
 Turnbull Cup MJHL Championship (1940)
 AHL Second All-Star Team (1941)
 NHL Second All-Star Team (1949, 1950, & 1951)
 Hart Memorial Trophy Winner (1950)
 Played in the NHL All-Star Game (1949, 1950, & 1951)
 Inducted into the Hockey Hall of Fame in 1973
 Honoured Member of the Manitoba Hockey Hall of Fame
 In the 2009 book 100 Ranger Greats, was ranked No. 16 all-time of the 901 New York Rangers who had played during the team's first 82 seasons

Career statistics

Regular season and playoffs

References

External links
 
 Charlie (Chuck) Rayner biography at the Manitoba Hockey Hall of Fame

1920 births
2002 deaths
Canadian ice hockey goaltenders
Hart Memorial Trophy winners
Hockey Hall of Fame inductees
Ice hockey people from Saskatchewan
Sportspeople from Saskatoon
Kenora Thistles players
New York Americans players
Brooklyn Americans players
New York Rangers players
Springfield Indians players